Barcode games are games that use barcodes, usually to enter characters and items for use in the game.

Designated consoles
Numerous stand-alone card set games were released specifically for the following consoles.
Barcode Battler
Barcode Battler
Barcode Battler II
Barcode Eleven
Barcode Printer
Sega Barcode Arcade Machines
Dinosaur King
Love and Berry
LilPri
Digimon Frontier (Japanese version)
Skannerz'
Skannerz
Skannerz Commander
Skannerz Racerz
Saiyan Skannerz
Dragon Ball GT (Saiyan Skannerz)
Skannerz TV
Barbie Scanimals
Super Barcode Wars
Super Barcode Wars
Super Barcode Wars: Dragon Ball Z
Tiger Barcodzz
X-Men
Mighty Morphin Power Rangers
Mortal Kombat
Super Street Fighter II
The Adventures of Batman and Robin

Interfaced games

Interface technology allowed the linking (usually via cables) of barcode-scanner hardware to other consoles. Games released for non-scanning consoles would employ the barcode scanner as a means to unlock secret content within the game or to add enhanced functionality. A number of games also relied on the barcode-scanning portion of the game in a manner which was integral to gameplay.

Famicom: Barcode World cable
Barcode World

Famicom: Datach Joint ROM System
Datach Battle Rush
Datach Crayon Shin-Chan
Datach J.League Super Top Players
Datach SD Gundam World
Datach Ultraman Club
Datach YuuYuu Hakusho
Dragon Ball Z: Gekitou Tenkaichi Budokai

Super Famicom: Barcode Battler II Interface
Alice no Paint Adventure
The Amazing Spider-Man: Lethal Foes
Barcode Battler Senki: Super Senshi Shutsugeki Seyo!
Donald Duck no Mahō no Bōshi
Doraemon 2: Nobita no Toizurando Daibouken
Doraemon 3: Nobita to Toki no Hougyoku
Dragon Slayer: The Legend of Heroes II
Hatayama Hatch no Pro Yakyuu News! Jitsumei Han
J-League Excite Stage '94
J-League Excite Stage '95
Lupin III: Densetsu no Hihō wo Oe!

Game Boy: Barcode Boy
Battle Space
Monster Maker: Barcode Saga

Game Boy Color: Barcode Taisen Bardigun
Barcode Taisen Bardigun

Game Boy Advance: Nintendo e-Reader
Animal Crossing
Domo-kun no Fushigi Terebi
Mario VS Donkey Kong (Nintendo e-Reader)
Pokémon Colosseum
Pokémon Emerald
Pokémon FireRed and LeafGreen
Pokémon Ruby and Sapphire
Rockman.EXE & Rockman Zero 3
Super Mario Advance 4: Super Mario Bros. 3

PlayStation 3: PlayStation Eye
The Eye of Judgment

PC
Barcode Beasties
Scan Command: Jurassic Park

Smartphone games

Android
Barcode RPG
Barcode Beasties
Barcode City
Barcode Empire
Barcode Rockstar
Barcode Warrior
Barcode Wars
Codemon (Barcode Monsters)
Barcode KANOJO
Barcode Knight

iOS
Barcode Coliseum
Barcode Hunt
Barcode Wars
Warcode
Barcode Warz in Space
Barcode Kingdom
Barcode Knight

References 

 
Barcode games